Auchenionchus microcirrhis is a species of labrisomid blenny endemic to the Pacific waters off of Chile.  It is a carnivorous species, eating fish, amphipods (juveniles), and decapods (adults).  This species can reach  in total length.

References

microcirrhis
Fish described in 1836